Jakub Matai (born May 9, 1993) is a Czech professional ice hockey winger. He is currently playing with HC Olomouc of the Czech Extraliga. He has previously played for Lev Poprad of the Kontinental Hockey League (KHL) during the 2011-12 season, and later HC Lev Praha.

References

External links 
 
 

1993 births
Living people
HC Lev Praha players
HC Lev Poprad players
HC Olomouc players
HC Dukla Jihlava players
People from Kadaň
Czech ice hockey forwards
Sportspeople from the Ústí nad Labem Region
Czech expatriate sportspeople in France
Expatriate ice hockey players in France
Czech expatriate ice hockey players in Slovakia